The TSMP Law Corporation is a leading law firm in Singapore.

History 
TSMP was founded in 1998 as Thio Su Mien & Partners. In 2001, the partnership was dissolved, and a new law corporation was formed, named TSMP Law Corporation. As of 2018, it had over 60 lawyers.

Pro-bono work 
During the pandemic, TSMP delivered gift packs to frontline workers at the Singapore General Hospital. In 2023, TSMP began offering pro-bono legal services to victims of sexual harassment.

Notable employees 

 Adrian Tan, president of the Law Society of Singapore
 Nadia Ahmad Samdin, member of parliament
 Thio Shen Yi, former president of the Law Society of Singapore
 Thio Su Mien, former dean of NUS Law

References

1998 establishments in Singapore
Companies established in 1998